Lenin, You Rascal, You is a 1972 Danish comedy film directed by  and starring Peter Steen. Jørgen Ryg won the Bodil Award for Best Actor in a Supporting Role for his role as adjutant Mühlhauser.

Cast 
 Peter Steen as Lenin
 Dirch Passer as General Ludendorff
 Jørgen Ryg as Ludendorff's adjudant Mühlhauser
 Judy Gringer as Madame Holliday
 Eva Danné as Vanessa
 Ove Sprogøe as British Ambassador Mulligan
 Lisbet Lundquist as Liza / Princess Zenia
 Ulf Pilgaard as Train driver
  as The Czar
 Otto Brandenburg as Bodyguard of the Czar / Dinerman in Berlin
 Bodil Udsen as A German Democrat

References

External links 
 
 
 

1972 comedy films
1972 films
Danish comedy films
1970s Danish-language films